Lifepod may refer to:
 Lifepod (1993 film), a television film reworking of the Alfred Hitchcock film Lifeboat
 Lifepod (1981 film), an1 American science fiction thriller film
 Escape pod or lifepod